Offerings is the fourth studio album by American indie rock band Typhoon. It was released in January 2018. This was the second studio album released under Roll Call Records.

Morton described the album as being broken into four movements: Floodplains, Flood, Reckoning, and Afterparty. In a promotional tweet, the band describes the album as:

Background
In an interview with Sound of Boston, violinist Shannon Steele explained that the album came out of a long break from playing live shows and the changes in the band makeup, noting: "One of the first songs that Kyle brought to the group to start working out was Empiricist. It had such a heavy, grungy feel that we all were really enthusiastic about." The record was produced by Morton, and features some of his field recordings.

Track listing

Personnel

Musicians
 Kyle Morton – lead vocals, guitar
 Tyler Ferrin – guitar, piano, backing vocals
 Alex Fitch – drums, backing vocals
 Devin Gallagher – glockenspiel, percussion, backing vocals
 Dave Hall – guitar, backing vocals
 Pieter Hilton – drums, percussion, electronics, vocals
 Shannon Steele - violin, vocals
 Toby Tanabe – bass, backing vocals

Production
 Produced by Kyle Morton
 Mastering by Adam Gonsalves
 Mixed by Jeff Stuart Saltzman 
 Artwork by Rick Delucco

Charts

Release history

References

External links
 Official website

2018 albums
Typhoon (American band) albums